Eternal Majesty is a French black metal band.

It was formed by four brothers under the original name of Enchantress Moon.

Statistics 
Genre: Black metal
Country: France
Status: Active
Time: 1995 -

Discography

Albums 
2002 - From War to Darkness (CD)
2003 - From War to Darkness (Picture disk)
2006 - Wounds of Hatred and Slavery (CD)
2020 - Black Metal Excommunication (CD) (Cassette Tape) (Vinyl)

Other Releases 
 1997 - Dark Empire (Demo tape)
 1998 - Split demo with Antaeus
 2000 - Evil Consecration (Live tape)
 2000 - None Shall Escape the Wrath (Split CD with Krieg, Judas Iscariot, and Macabre Omen)
 2001 - Unholy Chants of darkness (Split LP with Temple of Baal)
 2001 - SPK Kommando (Split EP with Deviant, Antaeus and Hell Militia)
 2005 - Night Evilness (Mcd) label Diahableries
 2006 - Wounds of Hatred and Slavery (Album Candlelight/appease me...)

Band members 
 Navint (Deviant) - Vocals - (1995 - )
 Sagoth (Madonagun, Antaeus, Autolyse-Dark Electro) - Bass - (1995 - )
 Thorgon (Madonagun, Antaeus, Deviant, Autolyse-Dark Electro) - Drums - (1995 - )
 Martyr (Atrox) - Guitars - (1995 - )

External links 
 https://eternalmajesty.bandcamp.com
 https://web.archive.org/web/20060307003643/http://www.candlelightrecords.co.uk/candleweb/redesign/candle_eternal.htm
 https://www.instagram.com/eternalmajestyofficial/?hl=fr

French black metal musical groups
Musical groups established in 1995
Musical quartets